The Panasonic Lumix DMC-FZ8 is a 7 megapixel superzoom bridge digital camera made by Panasonic. As with most Panasonic Lumix cameras, it uses a Venus Engine, in this case, the Venus Engine III. It supports the Raw image format and has the same sensor size and zoom level as its predecessor, the Panasonic Lumix DMC-FZ7.

The DMC-FZ8 became available in the United States in February 2007.

Improvements over DMC-FZ7 
The DMC-FZ8 has several improvements.

7 megapixel resolution vs. 6 megapixels
Venus III vs. Venus II processor
Raw mode
ISO 100-3200 vs. 100-1600
SD, MMC, and SDHC for storage vs. SD and MMC
f/2.8-3.3 Leica zoom lens
Higher resolution screen and viewfinder, along with other interface tweaks
27 MB built in memory

Other features 

 Mega O.I.S. (optical image stabilizer) in the lens
 Intelligent ISO Control
 Extra Optical Zoom (digital zoom)
 VGA movie mode in both normal and wide aspect ratio

The camera has a 2.5" color LCD display and a color electronic viewfinder, and is available in two colors, black (suffix K) and silver (suffix S).

Reception 
In a review, CNET gave the camera 7.5/10 stars, praising the camera's fast zoom lens; joystick and manual controls; optical image stabilization system; compact size; and raw image format. However, they criticized its image quality, misleading optical zoom labeling, and noise issues, as well as the ISO 3200 option being hidden in a specific usage mode, though they noted that may be beneficial to users as the manual specifies that the ISO 3200 would blur much useful detail. Overall, it was described as a decent camera for beginners or intermediate users.

References

External links
 CNET Review 
 MegaPixel.net Review
 Digital Photography Review 

Bridge digital cameras
Superzoom cameras
FZ8
Leica Camera
Live-preview digital cameras